Paint Rock may refer to:

Paint Rock, Alabama, town in Jackson County
Paint Rock, Texas, town in Concho County
Paint Rock River, tributary of the Tennessee River in northern Alabama

See also
Painted Rock (disambiguation)